Readlyn may refer to:
 Readlyn, Iowa, United States
 Readlyn, Saskatchewan, Canada